Chasm City is a 2001 science fiction novel by British writer Alastair Reynolds, set in the Revelation Space universe. It deals with themes of identity, memory, and immortality, and many of its scenes are concerned primarily with describing the unusual societal and physical structure of the titular city, a major nexus of Reynolds's universe. It won the 2002 British Science Fiction Association award.

Synopsis
Chasm City is framed and largely written in the voice of Tanner Mirabel, a security expert who has come to Chasm City to avenge the death of his former client's wife at the hands of a "postmortal" noble named Argent Reivich.

Tanner arrives to find that Yellowstone, the most advanced civilization in human history, has descended into squalor; an alien nanotech virus known as the Melding Plague has wreaked havoc throughout the system. Chasm City, a dense forest of mile-high shapeshifting skyscrapers, has melted into a slum. The Glitter Band, a sparkling diorama of ten thousand orbital habitats, has been reduced to a "Rust Belt" of a few hundred survivors, mostly primitive and pre-nanotech antiques.

In this chaos of plague and desolation, Tanner seeks his prey, only to discover that Reivich is more clever than he originally thought. In the midst of his hunt, he begins experiencing virus-induced flashbacks from the life of Sky Haussmann, the founder of his home world, Sky's Edge, who is both revered and reviled for the crimes he committed for his people.

From the depths of the gas plume at the heart of Chasm City, to the aristocratic canopy spanning what remains of the skyscrapers, Mirabel begins to unravel the mystery of the Melding Plague.

Awards and nominations
Chasm City won the 2002 British Science Fiction Association award.

See also
Revelation Space universe

References
Notes

Bibliography
 Cannon, Peter, and Jeff Zaleski. "Chasm City (Book)". Publishers Weekly 249.10 (11 March 2002): 56.
 Cassada, Jackie. "Chasm City (Book)". Library Journal 127.7 (15 April 2002): 128.
 Mort, John. "Chasm City (Book)". Booklist 98.15 (Apr. 2002): 1313.
 Vanderbilt, Tom. "Alastair Reynolds, Chasm City". Artforum International 42.4 (Dec. 2003): 128–128.

External links 
 Extract from the novel

2001 British novels
Fiction set around Epsilon Eridani
Revelation Space
2001 science fiction novels
Space opera novels
Novels by Alastair Reynolds
Nanopunk
Fiction about memory erasure and alteration
Victor Gollancz Ltd books